László Pető (born 25 June 1969) is a Hungarian sports shooter. He competed in the men's 10 metre air pistol event at the 1992 Summer Olympics.

References

External links
 

1969 births
Living people
Hungarian male sport shooters
Olympic shooters of Hungary
Shooters at the 1992 Summer Olympics
People from Tata, Hungary
Sportspeople from Komárom-Esztergom County